Metaxyonycha is a genus of leaf beetles in the subfamily Eumolpinae.

Taxonomy
Metaxyonycha was first named by Louis Alexandre Auguste Chevrolat in 1836, with the spelling "Metazyonycha", in Dejean's Catalogue of Coleoptera. According to Bousquet et al. in 2013, Metaxyonycha is an incorrect subsequent spelling of Metazyonycha. However, because the subsequent spelling is in prevailing usage and is attributed to the original spelling's publication, "Metaxyonycha" is considered the correct spelling.

In some publications for the Neotropical realm, Metaxyonycha is also known as "Colaspis". This was because the Czech entomologist Jan Bechyné had synonymised Metaxyonycha with Colaspis, after incorrectly assuming the two had the same type species, while splitting the species of Colaspis in the Junk-Schenkling catalog into a separate genus known as "Maecolaspis". As a result, Bechyné was using the name Colaspis for what was actually Metaxyonycha.

Species
The following species belong to the genus Metaxyonycha (or Colaspis sensu Bechyné):

 Metaxyonycha acuminipennis (Blanchard, 1843)
 Metaxyonycha amasia Marshall, 1864
 Metaxyonycha angusta (Perty, 1832)
 Metaxyonycha angusta angusta (Perty, 1832)
 Metaxyonycha angusta kosñipata (Bechyné & Bechyné, 1968)
 Metaxyonycha apochroma (Bechyné & Bechyné, 1976)
 Metaxyonycha argentiniensis Bechyné, 1949
 Metaxyonycha auripennis (Germar, 1824)
 Metaxyonycha boggianii (Bechyné, 1957)
 Metaxyonycha bogotensis Jacoby, 1900
 Metaxyonycha bogotensis bogotensis Jacoby, 1900
 Metaxyonycha bogotensis splendicans (Bechyné & Bechyné, 1968)
 Metaxyonycha bondari (Bechyné & Bechyné, 1968)
 Metaxyonycha carminea (Bechyné, 1955)
 Metaxyonycha chloroptera (Germar, 1824)
 Metaxyonycha chlorospila Marshall, 1864
 Metaxyonycha chotana (Bechyné, 1958)
 Metaxyonycha comica (Bechyné, 1953)
 Metaxyonycha concinna Lefèvre, 1883
 Metaxyonycha connexa Marshall, 1864
 Metaxyonycha corpulenta (Bechyné, 1955)
 Metaxyonycha costata Lefèvre, 1877
 Metaxyonycha crucifera Marshall, 1864
 Metaxyonycha defficiens (Bechyné, 1953)
 Metaxyonycha denieri (Bechyné, 1953)
 Metaxyonycha diringshofeni (Bechyné & Bechyné, 1968)
 Metaxyonycha distincta Baly, 1881
 Metaxyonycha dominga (Bechyné, 1958)
 Metaxyonycha elegans Lefèvre, 1883
 Metaxyonycha elytrospila (Bechyné & Bechyné, 1968)
 Metaxyonycha excentritarsis (Bechyné & Bechyné, 1968)
 Metaxyonycha fasciata Lefèvre, 1875
 Metaxyonycha fasciata caurensis (Bechyné & Bechyné, 1968)
 Metaxyonycha fasciata fasciata Lefèvre, 1875
 Metaxyonycha flavofasciata (Bowditch, 1921)
 Metaxyonycha fuscovitatta (Bechyné, 1954)
 Metaxyonycha godmani (Jacoby, 1879)
 Metaxyonycha gounelli Lefèvre, 1891
 Metaxyonycha gounelli acrospina (Bechyné & Bechyné, 1968)
 Metaxyonycha gounelli gounelli Lefèvre, 1891
 Metaxyonycha granulata (Germar, 1821)
 Metaxyonycha guttifera (Bechyné, 1955)
 Metaxyonycha guttifera guttifera (Bechyné, 1955)
 Metaxyonycha guttifera lepidosoma (Bechyné & Bechyné, 1968)
 Metaxyonycha haroldi (Lefèvre, 1891)
 Metaxyonycha hirsuta Jacoby, 1890
 Metaxyonycha hirtipennis (Jacoby, 1881)
 Metaxyonycha humeralis Marshall, 1864
 Metaxyonycha humilis Marshall, 1864
 Metaxyonycha hybrida (Lefèvre, 1878)
 Metaxyonycha jeanneli (Bechyné, 1951)
 Metaxyonycha jusepinensis (Bechyné & Bechyné, 1968)
 Metaxyonycha lacerdae Lefèvre, 1884
 Metaxyonycha lefevrei (Harold, 1875)
 Metaxyonycha lima (Bechyné, 1955)
 Metaxyonycha limbata (Jacoby, 1890)
 Metaxyonycha longicornis (Bechyné, 1951)
 Metaxyonycha martinezi (Bechyné, 1951)
 Metaxyonycha mattogrossoensis (Scherer, 1964)
 Metaxyonycha medeirosi (Bechyné & Bechyné, 1961)
 Metaxyonycha melanocephala (Bechyné, 1953)
 Metaxyonycha melanogastra (Lefèvre, 1884)
 Metaxyonycha mendesi Bechyné, 1949
 Metaxyonycha mendesi mendesi Bechyné, 1949
 Metaxyonycha mendesi zikani (Bechyné, 1953)
 Metaxyonycha minarum (Lefèvre, 1888)
 Metaxyonycha montesi (Bechyné, 1953)
 Metaxyonycha nigritarsis Lefèvre, 1875
 Metaxyonycha nigritarsis minor (Bechyné, 1953)
 Metaxyonycha nigritarsis nigritarsis Lefèvre, 1875
 Metaxyonycha ocanana (Lefèvre, 1878)
 Metaxyonycha octosignata Baly, 1881
 Metaxyonycha pallidula (Boheman, 1858)
 Metaxyonycha pallidula interior (Bechyné, 1958)
 Metaxyonycha pallidula pallidula (Boheman, 1858)
 Metaxyonycha panamensis Jacoby, 1890
 Metaxyonycha parallela (Bechyné, 1951)
 Metaxyonycha piceola (Bechyné & Bechyné, 1968)
 Metaxyonycha plagiata Lefèvre, 1891
 Metaxyonycha porcata (Germar, 1824)
 Metaxyonycha problematica (Bechyné, 1951)
 Metaxyonycha pulchra (Scherer, 1964)
 Metaxyonycha quadrimaculata (Olivier, 1808)
 Metaxyonycha quadrinotata Marshall, 1864
 Metaxyonycha radioni (Bechyné, 1952)
 Metaxyonycha richteri (Bechyné, 1953)
 Metaxyonycha rosiovittata Bechyné, 1949
 Metaxyonycha rosiovittata obsoleta (Bechyné & Bechyné, 1968)
 Metaxyonycha rosiovittata rosiovittata Bechyné, 1949
 Metaxyonycha rugosa Jacoby, 1900
 Metaxyonycha salvini Jacoby, 1881
 Metaxyonycha sanguinea Lefèvre, 1878
 Metaxyonycha schinicola (Bechyné, 1958)
 Metaxyonycha seabrai (Bechyné & Bechyné, 1968)
 Metaxyonycha semiocclusa (Bechyné, 1951)
 Metaxyonycha sergipensis (Bechyné & Bechyné, 1968)
 Metaxyonycha signata Lefèvre, 1885
 Metaxyonycha spinifera (Bechyné, 1957)
 Metaxyonycha tarsata Baly, 1881
 Metaxyonycha tejucana Marshall, 1864
 Metaxyonycha tenuenotata (Bechyné, 1950)
 Metaxyonycha testacea (Fabricius, 1801)
 Metaxyonycha tetrasticta Marshall, 1864
 Metaxyonycha tricolor (Perty, 1832)
 Metaxyonycha tridentata Jacoby, 1877
 Metaxyonycha trigonomera (Bechyné & Bechyné, 1968)
 Metaxyonycha validicornis Lefèvre, 1885
 Metaxyonycha variolosa Jacoby, 1890
 Metaxyonycha vianai Bechyné, 1949
 Metaxyonycha vigia (Bechyné & Bechyné, 1961)
 Metaxyonycha violena (Bechyné, 1954)
 Metaxyonycha viridilimbata Lefèvre, 1877
 Metaxyonycha vittulosa (Bechyné, 1951)
 Metaxyonycha weyrauchi (Bechyné, 1950)
 Metaxyonycha weyrauchi chaparensis (Bechyné, 1951)
 Metaxyonycha weyrauchi weyrauchi (Bechyné, 1950)

The following species are synonyms:
 Metaxyonycha batesi Baly, 1881: Synonym of Metaxyonycha angusta (Perty, 1832)
 Metaxyonycha formosa Lefèvre, 1883: Synonym of Metaxyonycha angusta (Perty, 1832)
 Metaxyonycha pretiosa Baly, 1881: Synonym of Metaxyonycha angusta (Perty, 1832)

References

Chrysomelidae genera
Eumolpinae
Beetles of North America
Beetles of South America
Taxa named by Louis Alexandre Auguste Chevrolat